Did We Meet Somewhere Before is a 1954 Soviet comedy film directed by Nikolay Dostal and Andrey Tutyshkin.

Plot 
The film tells about the successful comic actor Gennadiy Maksimov who goes with his wife, Larisa, to the Crimea. But suddenly Larisa is called to the theater of miniatures instead of one actress, who fell ill, and she leaves her husband. He had to fall behind the train. On the way, he gets to know different people and every meeting is a small play.

Starring 
 Arkadi Rajkin as Gennadiy Vladimirovich Maksimov
 Lyudmila Tselikovskaya as Larisa Levkoyeva
 Mikhail Yanshin as Vasilyev
 Maria  Mironova as Veronika Platonovna Malyarskaya  
 Vladimir Lepko as Afanasiy Ivanovich
 Vasili Merkuryev as director of theater
 Aleksandr Benyaminov as photographer
 Olga Aroseva as resting girl
  Andrey Tutyshkin as Fedor Vasilievich
 Mikhail Pugovkin as policeman
 Sergey Filippov as unhappy photographer client
 Vladimir Gulyaev as cyclist
 Galina Korotkevich as Maksimov's compartment neighbor
 Nikolay Trofimov as taxi driver
 Zinaida Sharko as telephone operator at the post office, Maksimov's fan 
  Yuri Sarantsev as administrator of the miniature theater
 Stepan Kayukov as train station grocery seller

References

External links 
 

1954 films
Soviet comedy films
1950s Russian-language films
Mosfilm films
1954 comedy films
Soviet black-and-white films